Aikim Andrews (born 20 June 1996) is a Trinidadian professional footballer.

Career

Professional

Andrews started his career with W Connection F.C. in the TT Pro League.  He made 6 appearances with W Connection in the 2015-2016 CONCACAF Champions League.

On April 3, 2017 Andrews signed a professional contract with Toronto FC II of USL.

References

External links 
 

1996 births
Living people
Association football midfielders
Trinidad and Tobago footballers
Trinidad and Tobago international footballers
W Connection F.C. players
Toronto FC II players
TT Pro League players
2015 CONCACAF U-20 Championship players
USL Championship players
Trinidad and Tobago under-20 international footballers
Footballers at the 2015 Pan American Games